Eugène Gaillard (1862–1933) was a French art nouveau industrial designer, architect and advocate of modern design. Gaillard abandoned a career in law for that of interior design and decoration. He was employed for some time by Siegfried Bing along with Georges de Feure and Edouard Colonna to work on his pavilion at the 1900 Paris Universal Exposition.

Bibliography
A Propos du Mobilier - Eugène Gaillard (1906)

References

1862 births
1933 deaths
Architects from Paris
Art Nouveau designers
French industrial designers
Art Nouveau architects
19th-century French architects
20th-century French architects